Bixbee, is a benefit corporation based in Chicago, Illinois. Founded in 2013. It designs and sells children's products with a "One Here. One There." mission: for every backpack purchased, a schoolbag with supplies is donated to a child in need.

References

External links 

Companies based in Chicago
Companies established in 2013